The Île Sainte-Marguerite is the largest of the Lérins Islands, about half a mile off shore from the French Riviera town of Cannes.

The island is most famous for its fortress prison (the Fort Royal), in which the so-called Man in the Iron Mask was held in the 17th century.

History
The island is first known to have been inhabited during Roman times, when it was known by the name Lero. The island was probably renamed in medieval times by crusaders, who built a chapel to Saint Margaret of Antioch on the island. In the 14th century, probably due to the writings of Raymond Féraud, the island became associated with a fictional Sainte Marguerite, sister to Saint Honoratus, founder of the monastery on the neighbouring Île Saint-Honorat. According to legend, Sainte Marguerite led a community of nuns on the island which was named after her.

In 1612, ownership of the island passed from the monks of Saint-Honorat to Claude de Lorraine, Duke of Chevreuse. Shortly after, construction of a fort on the island (to become the Fort Royal) began. In 1635, the island was captured by the Spanish and recaptured by the French two years later.

Towards the end of the 17th century, the Fort Royal became home to a barracks and state prison. During the 18th century, the present-day village of Sainte-Marguerite developed, thriving on the spending power of the soldiers stationed on the island.

The Fort Royal was home to a number of famous prisoners until its closure in the 20th century. Besides the Man in the Iron Mask, a mysterious prisoner whose identity remains unknown, Abd al-Qadir al-Jaza'iri (an Algerian rebel leader), Marquis Jouffroy d’Abbans (inventor of the steamboat) and Marshal Bazaine (the only successful escapee from the island) have all spent time there.

Present

A fifteen-minute boat ride from Cannes, the Île de Sainte-Marguerite is low in profile and heavily wooded with umbrella pines and eucalyptus. Both islands (with the Île Saint-Honorat) are looked after by the Office national des forêts, and are a popular tourist attraction of natural interest.

During the summer months, a large number of boats moor in the shallow, protected "Plateau du Milieu", between the islands or on the landward side of Sainte-Marguerite where there is more room for water skiing, parascending and other popular water sports.

The village of Sainte-Marguerite is made up of about twenty buildings. Most of these are home to fishermen, but there is also a small boatyard and one or two establishments offering refreshments to tourists. The island's hotel has been closed down since the summer of 2005.

The historic Fort Royal now houses a youth hostel and a Museum of the Sea, featuring items recovered from ancient Roman and Saracen shipwrecks. Visitors are also able to view a number of former prison cells (including that occupied by the Man in the Iron Mask) and a Roman cistern room.

Close to the Fort Royal is a small cemetery for French soldiers who died there when it was used for convalescence during the Crimean War, and alongside it is a cemetery for North African soldiers killed on the Allied side during World War II.

It was in the news recently because the Indian businessman Vijay Mallya, owner of the Formula 1 team Force India and the Indian Premier League team Royal Challengers Bangalore, sold “Le Grand Jardin,” or “The Large Garden”, a unique piece of luxury real estate on the Island of Sainte-Marguerite, for between €37 million and €43 million ($53–61 million US).

The island is served all year round by a regular commercial ferry service from Cannes.

References

External links 
 
1. Le Grand Jardin, Ile Sainte-Marguerite, Cannes

Sainte-Marguerite
Cannes
Landforms of Alpes-Maritimes
Islands of Provence-Alpes-Côte d'Azur
Prison islands